Pannonian Croatia is one of the four NUTS-2 Regions of Croatia since 2021. The region is located in the continental part of the country, including eight counties of Croatia. The most populated cities in the region are Osijek, Slavonski Brod, Karlovac and Sisak. It accounts for 41% of the country's territory and 26% of the population. Pannonian Croatia is the poorest NUTS-2 region in Croatia with GDP PPS per capita at 40% of EU-27 average.

See also
 NUTS statistical regions of Croatia

References

Subdivisions of Croatia
NUTS 2 statistical regions of Croatia
NUTS 2 statistical regions of the European Union
Croatia